Varas is a village in Hesar Kharvan Rural District, Mohammadiyeh District, Alborz County, Qazvin Province, Iran. At the 2006 census, its population was 786, in 214 families.

References 

Populated places in Alborz County